This is a list of results for all the matches played from 1901 to 1950 by the São Paulo state football team.

Sources:

Results

References

São Paulo state football team results